Sir Ralph Milbanke (1725-1798) was an English baronet and Member of Parliament for Scarborough between 1754–61 and later for Richmond between 1761 and 1768.

Life 
Milbanke was born 1725 into an aristocratic landed Yorkshire family. His father was Sir Ralph Milbanke, 4th Baronet of Halnaby in the County of York who had served as High Sheriff of Yorkshire in 1721.  Milbanke himself served as High Sheriff of the same county for 1753–54.

He married Elizabeth Hedworth in 1748. They had issue:
 Sir Ralph Noel, 6th Bt. (1747-1825)
 John Milbanke
 Elizabeth Milbanke (1751-1818)

References 

1725 births
1798 deaths
British MPs 1754–1761
British MPs 1761–1768
Members of the Parliament of Great Britain for English constituencies
Baronets in the Baronetage of England
High Sheriffs of Yorkshire